Thenkurissi-II is a village in Palakkad district in the state of Kerala, India.

Demographics
 India census, Thenkurissi-II had a population of 12,791 with 6,158 males and 6,633 females.

References

Villages in Palakkad district